Viktor Fyodorovich Yerokhin (January 15, 1940 – May 10, 2014) was a Russian professional football coach and a former player.

References

External links 
 Career summary by KLISF

1940 births
2014 deaths
Soviet footballers
FC Ural Yekaterinburg players
FC Dnipro players
Russian football managers
FC Ural Yekaterinburg managers
Association football defenders
FC Zvezda Perm players